Richard Girulatis (21 August 1878 – 12 May 1963) was a German football manager.

Girulatis, having played for BTuFC Union 1892 in the 1905 Brandenburg football championship, went to live in the United States for some years. After coming back to Germany, he took over his old club and in 1912 became the first manager of Tennis Borussia Berlin. He was later manager of Hamburger SV and Hertha BSC.

References

Further reading 
 
 
 

1878 births
1963 deaths
German footballers
German football managers
Tennis Borussia Berlin managers
Hamburger SV managers
Hertha BSC managers
Association football forwards